The Milwaukee Short Film Festival is an annual film festival held in Milwaukee, Wisconsin.

History 

The festival was established in 1994 by the Milwaukee Independent Film Society and is held each year in September. In 2015, the festival screened 53 short films at ComedySportz in Walker's Point, Milwaukee. Thirty-six of the films were works by local filmmakers.

References

Further reading

External links
 Milwaukee Independent Film Society

Tourist attractions in Milwaukee
Short film festivals in the United States
Film festivals in Wisconsin
Festivals in Milwaukee
Film festivals established in 1994
1994 establishments in Wisconsin